The Munster Junior Hurling Championship is a junior "knockout" competition in the game of Hurling played in the province of Munster in Ireland. The series of games are organised by the Munster Council.

The winners of the Munster Junior Hurling Championship each year progress to play the other provincial champions for a chance to win the All-Ireland Junior Hurling Championship.

Generally, the strong hurling counties have fielded their second team in this competition. In recent years though, they have participated in the Munster Intermediate Hurling Championship instead. The competition has been suspended and is unlikely to be re-established. In the years between 1961 and 1973 Kerry represented Munster in the All-Ireland Junior Hurling Championship. From 1974 to 1982 there was no Munster team nominated.

Top winners

Roll of honour

 1939 Limerick awarded title on an objection
 1910 Final unfinished. Replay ordered.

Sources
 Roll of Honour on www.gaainfo.com
 Complete list of winning teams on Munster GAA website

Munster GAA inter-county hurling competitions